Plain old telephone service (POTS), or plain ordinary telephone system, is a retronym for voice-grade telephone service employing analog signal transmission over copper loops. POTS was the standard service offering from telephone companies from 1876 until 1988 in the United States when the Integrated Services Digital Network (ISDN) Basic Rate Interface (BRI) was introduced, followed by cellular telephone systems, and voice over IP (VoIP).  POTS remains the basic form of residential and small business service connection to the telephone network in many parts of the world. The term reflects the technology that has been available since the introduction of the public telephone system in the late 19th century, in a form mostly unchanged despite the introduction of Touch-Tone dialing, electronic telephone exchanges and fiber-optic communication into the public switched telephone network (PSTN).

Characteristics
POTS is characterized by several aspects:
Bi-directional (full duplex) communications.
Using balanced signaling of voltage analogs of sound pressure waves on a two-wire copper loop
Restricted to a narrow frequency range of 300–3,300 Hz, called the voiceband, which is much less than the human hearing range of 20–20,000 Hz
Call-progress tones, such as dial tone and ringing tone
Pulse dialing and dual-tone multi-frequency signaling (DTMF)
BORSCHT functions:  battery feed (B), over-voltage protection (O), ringing (R), signaling (S), coding (C), hybrid (H), and test (T)
Loop start, ground start and E&M signalling

The pair of wires from the central office switch to a subscriber's home is called a subscriber loop. It carries a direct current (DC) voltage at a nominal voltage of −48V when the receiver is on-hook, supplied by a power conversion system in the central office.  This power conversion system is backed up with a bank of batteries, resulting in continuation of service during interruption of power to the customer supplied by their electrical utility.

The maximum resistance of the loop is 1,700ohms, which translates into a maximum loop length of  using standard 24-gauge wire. (Longer loops are often constructed with larger, lower-resistance 19-gauge wire and/or specialized central office equipment called a loop extender. They may be  or more.)

Many calling features became available to telephone subscribers after computerization of telephone exchanges during the 1980s in the United States. The services include voicemail, caller ID, call waiting, speed dialing, conference calls (three-way calling), enhanced 911, and Centrex services.

The communication circuits of the public switched telephone network continue to be modernized by advances in digital communications; however, other than improving sound quality, these changes have been mainly transparent to customers. In most cases, the function of the local loop presented to the customer for connection to telephone equipment is practically unchanged and remains compatible with pulse dialing telephones.

Due to the wide availability of traditional telephone services, new types of communications devices, such as modems and fax machines, were initially designed to use traditional analog telephony to transmit digital information.

Reliability
Although POTS provides limited features, low bandwidth, and no mobile capabilities, it provides greater reliability than other telephony systems (mobile phone, VoIP, etc.). Many telephone service providers attempt to achieve dial-tone availability more than 99.999% of the time the telephone is taken off-hook. This is an often cited benchmark in marketing and systems-engineering comparisons, called the "five nines" reliability standard. It is equivalent to having a dial-tone available for all but about five minutes each year.
However, POTS depends upon a hardwired connection from each household to the phone company. Many new housing developments are being offered which do not have such a connection so these homes depend upon a VOIP non-hardwired linkage to the phone company. Thus they are dependent upon home internet service which can fail for several reasons.

Today, these have been replaced with optical glass fibers. Light is sent into one end of a glass or plastic cable at an angle large enough so that it will not be able to pass out of the cable into the surrounding air. The message is sent by light pulses and is more efficient and reliable. Since fiber can't transmit power, however, power has to be provided by the consumer instead of the telephone company. This leaves customers vulnerable to telephone outages during extended power outages. Providers of VOIP telephone services usually have backup battery in the telephony cable company modem, or in the case of fiber-to-the-home, a backup battery near the fiber to electrical converter box. These batteries provide anywhere from 8-12 hours of telephone service depending on battery capacity and health of the battery in addition to a live signal from the cable company still being received during the power outage.

See also

 25-pair color code
 Basic exchange telecommunications radio service
 Category 1 cable
 Dual-tone multi-frequency signaling
 Local telephone service
 Managed facilities-based voice network
 Network interface device
 Publicly Available Telephone Services
 Registered jack – the type of telephone jack common in most of the world for single-line POTS telephones
 Twisted pair, used as cabling in POTS

References

 
Telephone services